Shane Bourne (born 24 November 1949 in Melbourne, Victoria) is an Australian stand-up comedian, actor, musician, and television host.

Career

1970s

Co-founded Australian band Bandicoot with Mick Fettes (formerly of the band Madder Lake). They released a self-titled album in 1976 with a top-100 single "Living off the Radio".

1980s–1999
Bourne was a well-known comedic face throughout the 1980s and 1990s, with an acting role on the Australian version of the British sitcom, Are You Being Served? (in 1980 and 1981). He had regular appearances on the variety program Hey Hey It's Saturday (1988–1994) in various sketches, but mainly appeared on the Great Aussie Joke segment. He starred in the short-lived sitcom Bingles in 1992 and 1993. In 1996, Bourne hosted a revived Blankety Blanks, which lasted only two seasons.

He also had dramatic roles; he was in 3 episodes of the drama series Prisoner in the early 1980s as 3 different guest roles. He had a guest role in The Flying Doctors in 1995.

2000–present
Bourne made a change to dramatic acting and has been critically acclaimed. After a two-episode guest appearance on Blue Heelers in 2000, Bourne took the lead role of lawyer "Happy" Henderson, starring alongside Kerry Armstrong in the ABC TV legal-drama series MDA. The show ended after its third season in September 2005. This show won him 2 awards (see below). He also played a minor role in the film Kokoda, an Australia WWII film about the Kokoda Track in which he played as the battalion's doctor.

Bourne hosted the television series Thank God You're Here from 2006 to 2009. In 2006, he hosted How the Hell Did We Get Here?, a series that aired on ABC TV.

Bourne began acting in the Channel Seven drama series, City Homicide on 27 August 2007. He appeared on the show until its axing after season 5, in 2011.

Bourne participated in Who Do You Think You Are? in 2010. Bourne hosted the 2011 Logie Awards.

In 2012, Bourne appeared in the short-lived drama Tricky Business, that aired on the Channel Nine. He also starred in the telemovie The Great Mint Swindle.

In early 2014, he hosted the AACTA Awards on Channel Ten.

In June 2015, Bourne played the role of Evan Pettyman, a minor character in The Dressmaker. He also joined the fifteenth season of Dancing with the Stars as the new co-host alongside Edwina Bartholomew, replacing Daniel MacPherson.

Personal life
Has a daughter, Ruby Louise Bourne (born 20 November 1990).

Awards
At the AFI Awards, in 2003 and 2005, Bourne won the 'Best Actor in a Television Drama' award for his role in MDA, and was nominated for the same award in 2002.

At the 2003 Logies, he was nominated for the 'Most Outstanding Actor' award for his role in MDA.

Discography

Studio albums

References

External links 
 

1949 births
Living people
AACTA Award winners
Comedians from Melbourne
Australian male television actors
Australian stand-up comedians
Australian male comedians
Australian game show hosts